Petra Jimenez Maes (born October 5, 1947) is a former chief justice of the New Mexico Supreme Court. She was appointed to the New Mexico Supreme Court in 1998, and was the first female Hispanic person to serve on the high court. She was elected Chief Justice for the court twice, once in 2003 and again in 2012.

Petra Jimenez Maes grew up in Albuquerque, New Mexico. Her grandparents came from Mexico, and Maes spoke Spanish as a young child. Maes received a Bachelor of Arts from the University of New Mexico and a Juris Doctor from University of New Mexico School of Law. Maes was a state district judge in Santa Fe for 17 years before joining the state Supreme Court. 
She retired from active service on December 31, 2018.

See also
List of Hispanic/Latino American jurists

References

1947 births
Living people
20th-century American judges
20th-century American women judges
21st-century American judges
21st-century American women judges
American judges of Mexican descent
American lawyers of Mexican descent
Chief Justices of the New Mexico Supreme Court
Hispanic and Latino American judges
Justices of the New Mexico Supreme Court
New Mexico Democrats
People from Albuquerque, New Mexico
University of New Mexico alumni
University of New Mexico School of Law alumni
Women chief justices of state supreme courts in the United States